Club act!one is a regular stand-up comedy event in Finland, held since 2003. The event mostly occurs once per week in the Studio Pasila venue of the Helsinki City Theatre in Pasila, Helsinki, but performances may also occur in other cities, and private performances for events such as company parties can also be ordered.

External links
 Official site

Live stand-up comedy shows
Finnish comedy
Culture in Helsinki